Nuria Velasco (born ) is a Spanish group rhythmic gymnast. She represents her nation at international competitions.

Velasco participated at the 2004 Summer Olympics in Athens. She also competed at world championships, including at the 2005 World Rhythmic Gymnastics Championships in Baku, Azerbaijan.

References

External links
 Nuria Velasco at Sports Reference
 http://rsg.net/forum/viewtopic.php?p=150080&sid=83ce5d85890b5da83364f8f8eaeb84d4
 http://ww.todor66.com/olim//gymnastics/women_rhytmic_group.html

1985 births
Living people
Spanish rhythmic gymnasts
Place of birth missing (living people)
Gymnasts at the 2004 Summer Olympics
Olympic gymnasts of Spain
21st-century Spanish women